The Detective Bureau is one of 20 bureaus that constitute the New York City Police Department and is headed by the three-star Chief of Detectives. The Detective Squad was formed in 1857 with the Detective Bureau later formed in 1882.

The Detective Bureau's responsibilities include the prevention, detection, and investigation of crime. In March 2016, the Organized Crime Control Bureau (OCCB) was disbanded with all investigative entities moved to the Chief of Detectives office.

Units of a Precinct

Borough Commands
Each of the eight Detective Boroughs oversees all the precinct squads as well as the homicide squad, gang squad, and narcotics squad located within its command. Members of the Detective Bureau work closely with their counterparts in the Patrol Bureau to provide immediate investigations of crimes. Patrol Borough Staten Island is unique among the patrol boroughs of NYPD in that it serves as both a Patrol Borough command and as a quasi-Detective Borough command. The Assistant Chief of the Staten Island Patrol Borough supervises a unit of detectives, which oversees local detective squads in that borough's four precincts.

Special Victims Division 
The Special Victims Division, created in 2003, oversees all the borough Special Victims Squads. The Special Victims Division is part of the Detective Bureau and primarily investigates sex crimes, including:

 Any child under 13 years of age that is the victim of any sex crime or attempted sex crime by any person.
 Any child under 11 years of age who is the victim of abuse by a parent or person legally responsible for the care of the child.
 Any victim of rape or attempted rape
 Any victim of a criminal sexual act or an attempted criminal sexual act
 Victims of aggravated sexual abuse
 Victims of sexual abuse in the first degree

Additional sub-units of the Special Victims Division are listed below:

 Sex Offenders Monitoring Unit (SOMU): Monitors all state-designated sex offenders to ensure they are in compliance.
 Special Victims Liaison Unit (SVLU): Provides educational lectures to community and advocacy groups, schools and medical institutions concerning public as well as personal safety.
 DNA tracking unit (DNATU): Tracks and coordinates all scientific evidence relating to investigations involving sexual assault.

A fictional version of the Special Victims Division called the Special Victims Unit appears in the television program Law & Order: Special Victims Unit.

Major Crimes
Major Crimes aka the major case squad are one of the eight squads, task forces, and teams in the Special Investigation Division – is located at One Police Plaza in Manhattan. It handles the following cases:

 Kidnappings as directed by the Chief of Detectives
 Burglary or attempted burglary of a bank or bank safe
 Bank robbery or attempted bank robbery by an unarmed perpetrator
 Burglary of a truck with contents worth more than $100,000
 Larceny of a truck with contents worth more than $100,000
 Truck hijacking
 All robberies in warehouse depots or similar locations where the object of the crime is a truck or its contents
 All commercial burglaries in which the value of the property stolen exceeds $100,000
 Murder

The television program Law & Order: Criminal Intent features a fictional version of the Major Case Squad, which spends a majority of its time on high-profile murders— an area that the real Major Case Squad does not deal with. Ultimate responsibility for any homicide case in NYC rests with the precinct detective squad concerned, but the Major Case Squad has historically played a large and important role in the investigation of any homicide of an NYC police officer

Crime Scene Unit
The Crime Scene Unit (CSU) is a part of the NYPD Detective Bureau's Forensic Investigations Division, responsible for forensic investigations of all homicides and sexual assaults, as well as other crimes as deemed necessary by an investigating supervisor. Members of the Crime Scene Unit assist the precinct detectives in the processing of a crime scene as well as determining the proper routing of evidence between the Medical Examiner's office, the NYPD Police Lab and the NYPD Property Clerk.

The Crime Scene Unit is composed of NYPD detectives (or occasionally police officers that are awaiting their promotion to detective), not civilian technicians like crime scene units in other parts of the United States. Generally these detectives come from an Evidence Collection Team which is operated at the borough level.

The Crime Scene Unit covers all of the boroughs of New York City, but is staffed with fewer than 1% of the total number of detectives in the NYPD. These detectives are dedicated to doing what is necessary to ensure that the precinct detectives and the District Attorney have as much evidence to identify the perpetrator of the crime and convict them at trial.

The Crime Scene Unit has at its disposal many tools to process a crime scene including the materials needed to develop fingerprints, cast footwear and tire impressions, follow the trajectory of bullets fired through windows and the chemicals necessary to observe blood under special lighting conditions that would otherwise be invisible to the naked eye. The unit is also trained to process a crime scene in a hazardous environment, for example following a nuclear, biological or chemical attack.

Fictional versions of the Crime Scene Unit appears frequently in many television series and movies set in New York City, most notably in a majority of the Law & Order franchise as well as in CSI: New York and Castle (TV series).

Central Robbery Division
The Central Robbery Division deploys five Borough Robbery Squads (Bronx, Manhattan, Brooklyn, Queens and Staten Island) staffed by seasoned detectives to investigate serious robbery cases. Such cases include borough and citywide robbery patterns and all home invasion robberies. This division is the lead investigative unit for all planned or anticipated robberies within New York City and has a Joint Robbery Task Force in which members work in tandem with the ATF, FBI and U.S. Marshals.

The division is led by a Deputy Chief (one star) and has two Captains as Zone Commanders. Each individual squad is staffed with a Lieutenant as the Commanding Officer and Sergeants to run teams of Detectives. Each of the detectives assigned are from vast investigative backgrounds such as Precinct Detective Squads, Narcotics, Street Crime Units, Firearm Investigative Squads and Fugitive Enforcement Squads. This well rounded expertise assists in the long term prosecution of criminals and their apprehension.

Organization
Overall command is the Chief of Detectives  

Units within the Detective Bureau include the:

 Detective Borough Commands
 Manhattan South Detective Borough Commander: Assistant Chief - Michael J. Baldassano / Manhattan South Detective Borough Executive Officer: Deputy Chief - ? 
 Manhattan North Detective Borough Commander: Deputy Police Chief - Brian S. McGee  / Manhattan North Detective Borough Executive Officer: Inspector - Peter A. Fiorillo 
 Brooklyn South Detective Borough Commander: Deputy Chief - Joseph M. Gulotta  / Brooklyn South Detective Borough Executive Officer: Inspector - ? 
 Brooklyn North Detective Borough Commander: 
 Queens South Detective Borough Commander: Deputy P. Chief - Julie L. Morrill  / Queens North Detective Borough Executive Officer: Inspector - ? 
 Queens North Detective Borough Commander: Deputy Chief - Jerry O'Sullivan  / Queens North Detective Borough Executive Officer: Inspector - ? 
 Staten Island Detective Borough Commander: D. Inspector - Donald M. Boller  / Staten Island Detective Borough Executive Officer: Captain - Sadia A. Smith  
 The Bronx Detective Borough Commander: Deputy Chief - Timothy J. McCormack  / Bronx Detective Borough Executive Officer: Inspector - 
 Central Investigation and Resource Division—Inspector 
 Hostage Negotiation Team
 Homicide Analysis Unit
 Photographic Services
 Crime Stoppers Unit
 Training Unit
 Forensic Investigation Division Commander: Deputy Chief - Kevin M. Maloney  / Executive Officer: Captain - Derick J. Bentley  
 Crime Scene Unit: Deputy Inspector 
 Police Laboratory
 DNA Liaison Unit
 Latent Print Unit
 Ballistics Unit
 Bomb Squad Commander: Lieutenant - Mark E. Torre 
 Fugitive Enforcement Division Commander: Assistant Chief - ? 
 Violent Felony Apprehension Squad
 Regional Fugitive Task Force (NYPD, USMS)
 Juvenile Crime Squad
 Warrant Section
 Special Investigation Division Commander: Assistant Chief - ? 
 Surveillance and Apprehension Squad
 Animal Cruelty Investigation Squad
 Joint Robbery Apprehension Team
 Joint Bank Robbery Task Force
 Arson and Explosion Squad
 Hate Crimes Task Force
 Missing Persons Squad
 Major Case Squad
 Cold Case Squad
 Special Victims Division Commander: Deputy Chief - Carlos Ortiz 
 Cold Case Special Victims Squad
 Borough Special Victims Squads
 Transit Special Victims Squads
 Sex Offender Monitoring Unit
 Special Victims Liaison Team
 DNA Tracking Unit
 Central Robbery Division Commander: Deputy Chief 
 Transit Borough Robbery Squads
 Borough Robbery Squads
 Joint Robbery Task Force (NYPD, ATF, FBI, USM)
 Surveillance Teams
 Grand Larceny Division Commander: Deputy Inspector - Patrick Cortright  / EXO: Captain - Patrick D. Davis  
 BLAST- Burglary Larceny Apprehension Surveillance Teams
 Borough Grand Larceny Squads
 Financial Crimes Task Force: Deputy Inspector - Christopher C. Flanagan
 Special Frauds Squad
 Other units
 Gun Violence Suppression Division Commander: Deputy Chief - Jason A. Savino  / EXO: Deputy Inspector - Craig E. Edelman 
 Criminal Enterprise Division Commander: Assistant Chief - Christopher J. McCormick
 Vice Enforcement Division Commander: 
 Other units
 Borough Violent Crimes Squads
 Borough Overdose Squads
 Borough Homicide Squads
 District Attorney's Squad
 Borough Gang Squads
 Narcotics Borough

List of chief detectives

Popular culture

Over the years, NYPD Detectives have been fictionalized in television police procedurals such as Law & Order and five subsequent spin-offs, NYPD Blue, CSI: NY, Castle, Blue Bloods, Brooklyn Nine Nine and many others.

See also
 Federal Bureau of Investigation

References

External links 
 Archived official Detective Bureau NYPD website (2001)

Detective Bureau